Adam White (21 December 182319 May 1895) was a Swiss-born American soldier who received the Medal of Honor for his actions during the American Civil War.

Born in Switzerland on 21 December 1823, Adam White was a corporal in the Union Army during the American Civil War.  While assigned to the 11th West Virginia Infantry Regiment, for his actions on 2 April 1865 at Hatcher's Run, Virginia,  White was awarded the Medal of Honor on 13 June 1865.  His citation therefor reads:

White died on 19 May 1895 in Tyner, West Virginia.  He was buried in the Wadesville Cemetery in Wadesville, West Virginia.

References

1823 births
1895 deaths
19th-century Swiss people
American Civil War recipients of the Medal of Honor
foreign-born Medal of Honor recipients
Union Army non-commissioned officers
United States Army Medal of Honor recipients